Teresa Szmigielówna (9 October 1929 – 24 September 2013) was a Polish actress. She appeared in more than sixty films from 1951 to 2012.

Filmography

References

External links 

1929 births
2013 deaths
Polish film actresses